Other People's Children is a 2022 French drama film directed by Rebecca Zlotowski, starring Virginie Efira, Roschdy Zem, Chiara Mastroianni and Callie Ferreira-Goncalves. The tragic comedy tells the story of a middle-aged teacher who starts a new relationship. This creates a close bond with the little daughter of her partner.

The film had its premiere on September 4, 2022 at the 79th Venice International Film Festival and competed for Golden Lion award. It was theatrical released in France on 21 September 2022.

Synopsis
Rachel is 40 years old, single and has no children. She is working as a teacher at a middle school, and has a large circle of friends and also keeps in touch with her ex-husbands. She also takes guitar lessons and is happy with her life. Then one day, she falls in love with Ali and his four-year-old daughter Leila also enters her life. Rachel takes care of the toddler, cares for and soon loves it like her own. But she must recognize that the close bond with Leila also harbors a possible risk,  especially in relation to her birth mother Alice. Rachel doesn't want to put up with just being an "extra" in Leila's life. Time is also working against her, should she still fulfill her wish to have a child of her own at this age.

Cast
 Virginie Efira as Rachel
 Roschdy Zem as Ali
 Chiara Mastroianni as Alice
 Callie Ferreira-Goncalves as Leila 
 Yamée Couture as Louana
 Henri-Noël Tabary as Vincent
 Victor Lefebvre as Dylan
 Sebastien Pouderoux as Paul
 Michel Zlotowski as father
 Mireille Perrie as Mme Roucheray
 Frederick Wiseman as Dr. Wiseman
 Antonia Buresi as Mia
 Marlene Saldana as Soraya
 Anne Berest as Jeanne
 Marwen Okbi as Tarik

Production
Other People's Children is the fifth feature film by French director and screenwriter Rebecca Zlotowski. The work is said to have been inspired by her relationship with director Jacques Audiard. She cast Virginie Efira, Roschdy Zem, Chiara Mastroianni and child actress Callie Ferreira-Goncalves in pivotal roles. She had previously collaborated with Zem on the television series Savages in 2019. In an interview, the actor noted Zlotowski's feminine gaze and that she would have created his part as Efira's lover without cliches. He recalled a scene where Efira's character was smoking and watching him take a shower. "I grew up with a movie theater, a television, an existence itself that was 95 percent male. This everyday patriarchy hurt me, but of course it's going away. I notice it with children of my son's age," says Zem.

The film was produced by Frédéric Jouve for Les Films Velvet, who in the same capacity oversaw all of Zlotowski's previous feature films. France 3 Cinéma appeared as co-producer. The broadcasting rights were secured in advance by Canal+ Cinéma and France Télévisions. The project was supported by the national film promotion authority Centre national du cinéma et de l'image animée (CNC) and the SOFICA companies Indéfilms, Cinécap and Cineventure. For camera and editing, Zlotowski engaged George Lechaptois and Géraldine Mangenot, with whom she worked on her previous feature film, An Easy Girl (2019). The film music was composed by Robin Coudert alias Rob.

Principal photography began in March 2021.

Release
The film had its world premiere at the 79th Venice International Film Festival on 4 September 2022, and competes for Golden Lion in 'In competition' section. It also held its North American Premiere at 2022 Toronto International Film Festival in 'Special Presentations' section on 8 September 2022 at Scotiabank Theatre, Toronto. Later it was released by Ad Vitam in France on 21 September 2022. It also made it to 'World Cinema' section of 27th Busan International Film Festival and was screened on 9 October 2022. In November 2022, it was featured in 'Country in focus' section of 53rd International Film Festival of India. Later in December, it was invited to Spotlight section of 2023 Sundance Film Festival to be held from January 19 to 29, 2023.

Reception
On the review aggregator Rotten Tomatoes website, the film has an approval rating of 89% based on 18 reviews, with an average rating of 7.3/10. On Metacritic, it has a weighted average score of 76 out of 100 based on 7 reviews, indicating "generally favorable reviews". AlloCiné rated the film  4.1/5, based on 36 reviews, which is an 'Average grade'.

Guy Lodge of Variety wrote: "Zlotowski’s deft, perceptive original screenplay is keenly attuned to the cutting emotional impact of a passing remark or overheard jab, and the unintended microaggressions that parents occasionally toss at their child-free peers." Ben Croll of IndieWire graded the film with B+ and wrote, "Other People’s Children feels, to put it bluntly, delightfully French."

Awards and nominations

References

External links
  in French 
 
 Other People’s Children in Toronto International Film Festivals 
 Other People's Children in Venice International Film Festival

2022 films
2022 comedy-drama films
2020s French-language films
Films directed by Rebecca Zlotowski
French comedy-drama films
2020s French films